Nepogomphoides is a genus of dragonfly in the family Gomphidae. It contains the following species:
 Nepogomphoides stuhlmanni

References 

Gomphidae
Anisoptera genera
Taxonomy articles created by Polbot